The 1914 Harvard Crimson football team represented Harvard University in the 1914 college football season. The Crimson finished with an undefeated  record under seventh-year head coach Percy Haughton. Harvard outscored its opponents by a combined score of  but tied Penn State and Brown.

Walter Camp selected four Harvard players (end Huntington "Tack" Hardwick, tackle Walter Trumbull, guard Stan Pennock, and halfback Eddie Mahan) as first-team members of his All-American Team.

The Crimson played in the inaugural game at the Yale Bowl on November 21; Harvard defeated rival Yale, 36–0, with over 68,000 in attendance.

Schedule

References

Harvard
Harvard Crimson football seasons
Harvard Crimson football
1910s in Boston